The 1982 Railway Cup Hurling Championship was the 56th staging of the Railway Cup since its establishment by the Gaelic Athletic Association in 1927. The cup began on 14 February 1982 and ended on 17 March 1982.

Munster were the defending champions, however, they were beaten by Connacht in the semi-final.

On 17 March 1982, Connacht won the cup after a 3-08 to 2-09 defeat of Leinster in the final at O'Connor Park. This was their third Railway Cup title overall and their first title since 1980.

Results

Semi-finals

Final

Scoring statistics

Top scorers overall

Bibliography

 Donegan, Des, The Complete Handbook of Gaelic Games (DBA Publications Limited, 2005).

References

Railway Cup Hurling Championship
Railway Cup Hurling Championship
Hurling